This is a list of fictional characters from the series Little Battlers Experience and its sequel,  Little Battlers eXperience W.

Main characters
Van Yamano, known as  

LBX: AX-00 → Achilles → Odin → Epsilon (game only) → Elysion → Ikaros Zero → O Legion (temporary) → Achilles II → Odin MK2 
A 13-year-old boy and the main protagonist of the series. Van is a young man whose is very obsessed with LBX Toys and is always wanted to collect them. His father was the inventor responsible for creating the LBX Toys, but since he has been missing from airplane, Van's mother refused to have LBX Toys until the Mysterious Woman gave him an LBX, known as Achilles, saying the fate of the world rested on this LBX. Van later learns that his father is still somewhere and that airplane accident was a fake and was captured by an evil organization known as the 'Innovators', or New Dawn Raisers in the dub. Van continues to search for his father and fight with his rivals to defeat the evil man responsible for kidnapping his father.

LBX: Kunoichi → Pandora → Dark Pandora → Pandora → Kunoichi 2
A 13-year-old girl and a classmate of Van. Bright and studious, she's a real walking encyclopedia on LBX! She gets LBX Pandora by solving its mystery.

LBX: Warrior → Egypt → Gladiator (rental) → Hunter → Fenrir → Achilles DEED → Hunter 2
 Van and Ami's best friend. He's a little cynic and unsure, but he's always there to help his friends with his LBX skills, strategy and cunning. He is expert in long range shooting.

LBX: Hakai-O → Hakai-O Zetto (Hakai-OZ) → Hakai-O King Devil
Hanz stole Achilles's armor frame by using a fake cash card. He was first defeated by Van. In season 2, he joins Van's gang in order to fight the Directors.

LBX: The Emperor → Emperor M2 → Proto Zenon → Zenon → Triton → Emperor M3
A mysterious, emotionless, and somewhat of a loner, Justin Kaido is practically the anti-Van. He is Yoshimitsu Kaido's Grandson. A new student at school, he spends all of his time battling with his LBX named Emperor. His skills are so advanced that Justin earned himself the nickname "Sudden Death Emperor" because it has never taken him more than 10 seconds to beat an opponent. In fact, the only time Justin has ever lost was when he battled Van. Afterwards he becomes Ban's friend and joins his team.

LBX:  Judge → Liu Bei
He is an LBX player who first shows himself in 2050 Artemis. He is being controlled by Innovator. Jin makes him normal. Afterwards in LBX W, he joins Ban.

Dak Sendo
Dak Sendo, known as 

LBX: Joker/Harlequin → Joker Mk-2/Harlequin Mk-2 → Nightmare → Nightmare Fear
He is the second one who defeated Gouda. He is known as the "Magician in the Box".

LBX: Perseus → Ikaros Force → Achilles D9 → Cosmic Hero Perseus S (game only) → Cosmic Hero Senshiman (game only) → Liu Bei White Phoenix (game only)
A boy with sharp reflexes and a natural talent with LBXs. The second protagonist of Danball Senki W. Loves video games and an old superhero TV show called "Galactic Hero Senshiman". He has a special ability of predicting future. When his concentration reaches a certain a limit, He becomes fast and attentive.

LBX: Minerva → Minerva Kai → Flame Empress Minerva → Minerva Kai-Ten (game only)
A feisty girl with good combat skills. Ran lives with her grandpa in her family's dojo, and is the inheritor of the Hanasaki style. She gets chosen to fight with Ban and Hiro against Detector by winning Minerva in a karate tournament.

LBX: Jeanne D →Jeanne Fox (game only)
She is the daughter of Owen Kaios.

LBX: Vampire Cat
The 14-year-old champion of the 2051 Artemis LBX world tournament with the nickname "Super Rookie".
Her LBX Vampire Cat was handmade by her little brother, Takeru. She has a habit of getting in other peoples'
business, and loves tomato juice. Everyone, including Hiro thought she was a boy until she commented after
winning.

Seekers and Van's Allies 

LBX: Hornet (game only)
 He is brother of Yuuske Uzaki and become the director of Tiny Orbit after his brothers death. He is the former and head of Seeker.

LBX: G-Lex → Ifreet
Lex is a member of Dr. Yamano's team. His father was killed by Cillian Kaido. Out of vengeance, Lex killed Cillian and placed an android in his place.

LBX: Amazoness
A gloomy and gothic girl who is one of Van's classmates. Mika maintains a friendly attitude for Van Yamano and the others. She happens to be quite sarcastic toward Gabe for his continuous bragging. All the while, she happens to be a big fan of Hanz Gordon, carrying pictures of him in her CCM as she admires him.

LBX: Buld → Buld Mod
 A goofy guy who isn't always bright and likes Amy. His appearance and personality resemble him as Kinniku Man.

LBX: Ruby Queen
A young girl who is a member of the Hands of Hanz

LBX: Mad Dog

LBX: Nazuu

 She is a member of seeker and an expert of control pod.

LBX: Pandora
He is the director of Tiny Orbit. He helped Ban and his friends in problems using Pandora. He died while saving Kirishima from innovator's truck.

 (Japanese), Sunni Westbrook (English)
LBX: Sakura☆Build 00, Queen Custom (both game only)

LBX: General → Commander I (game only)
He is the head of Black Team of Innovator who later joined Seeker.

 
LBX: ZX3 Build 01, ZX3 Build 02, ZX3 Build 03, Perfect ZX3, Perfect ZX4
He is also known as the Super Legendary Hacker\.

Agents 
A three-man team under the command of Aeron. Notable for their masks and black suits.

/Eeny

LBX: Deqoo → Deqoo Ace

/Meany

LBX: Deqoo → Deqoo Mod

/Miny

LBX: Deqoo → Deqoo Mod

New Dawn Raisers 

LBX: Gekkōmaru, Kaiser (AX-02)

LBX: Lucifer → Shadow Lucifer

Other Characters 

LBX: Masquerade J → Achilles DEED
He is the inventor of LBX.

LBX: Gladiator
He is a LBX shopkeeper. He gave ban a motor.

LBX: Kunoichi → Minerva Destroy (game only) → Kunoichi 2

LBX: Deqoo OZ, Joker Kirito Custom, Hakai-O Kirito Custom, Fenrir Flare, Crimson Emperor (game only)
He is the test player of Omegadain.

The Prime Minister of Japan.

He is NICS director.

Little Battlers Experience